Discus engonatus is an extinct species of air-breathing land snail, a terrestrial pulmonate gastropod mollusk in the family Discidae, the disk snails.

Discus engonatus was listed as Data deficient in the 1996 IUCN Red List, but it is considered to be extinct.

Distribution 
This species was endemic to Tenerife, Canary Islands.

References

Discidae
Invertebrates of the Canary Islands
Gastropods described in 1852
Taxobox binomials not recognized by IUCN